The Balanda Boor (or Boor) are an ethnic group numbering 40,000 to 50,000 people living in the South Sudanese states of Western Equatoria and Western Bahr el Ghazal. They speak the Belanda Bor language, however most are bilingual in Belanda Viri.

References

Ethnic groups in South Sudan